The Tversky index, named after Amos Tversky, is an asymmetric similarity measure on sets that compares a variant to a prototype. The Tversky index can be seen as a generalization of the Sørensen–Dice coefficient and the Jaccard index.

For sets X and Y the Tversky index is a number between 0 and 1 given by

Here,  denotes the relative complement of Y in X.

Further,  are parameters of the Tversky index.  Setting  produces the Tanimoto coefficient; setting  produces the Sørensen–Dice coefficient.

If we consider X to be the prototype and Y to be the variant, then  corresponds to the weight of the prototype and  corresponds to the weight of the variant.

Because of the inherent asymmetry, the Tversky index does not meet the criteria for a similarity metric. However, if symmetry is needed a variant of the original formulation has been proposed using max and min functions
.

,

,

Similarly,  controls the effect of the symmetric difference  versus  in the denominator.

Notes

Index numbers
Measure theory
Similarity measures
Asymmetry